Dromod is a village in County Leitrim, Ireland. Dromod is a noted fishing village beside Bofin and Boderg, which are threaded by the River Shannon. Built along the River Shannon, this is a Tidy Towns winner with a modern harbour frequented by cruiser traffic. The Bog Oak water feature in the centre of the village, entitled 'The Weeping Tree', and was made by a local craftsman from a piece of bog oak which was found nearby.

Demographics
Between 2006 and 2011, the population of Dromod increased from 210 to 356, an increase of 69.5%.

Dromod railway station
The village has a station on the Dublin-Sligo railway line connecting Sligo and Dublin Connolly long the mainline. Dromod railway station opened on 3 December 1862 and remains in operation, despite closing for goods services on 3 November 1975. Dromod also had a railway station on the narrow gauge Cavan and Leitrim Railway. It opened on 24 October 1887 and finally closed on 1 April 1959. A short section of narrow gauge line has been reopened at the station as part of preservation efforts.

History
In Gaelic Ireland the place was called "Dromode mac Shanley" in recognition of the dominant Mac Shanly sept of Muintir Eolais. The town is mentioned once in the Irish Annals- "".

An Iron works was established at Dromod . Pig iron brought to Dromod Finery forge was used to produce an malleable iron product, for transportation to Dublin and Limerick. The operation was closed down in the 1790s, due to an exhaustion of forests locally.

Through at least the 19th and 20th century, an impressive seven annual fairs were held at Dromod- 1 January, 28 March (or 29th), 15 May, 26 June (or 29th), 14 August, 10 October (or 11th), and 11 December.

People
 The 19th-century poet John McDonald lived near Dromod in County Leitrim.

See also
List of towns and villages in Ireland

Notes and references

Notes

Primary sources

Secondary sources

External links

Dromod railway station 
https://web.archive.org/web/20110201135748/http://godromod.com/

Towns and villages in County Leitrim